Operation Safe Haven, also known as Operation Mercy, was a refugee relief and resettlement operation executed by the United States following the Hungarian Revolution of 1956. Headed by task force commander General George B. Dany, it successfully evacuated over 27,000 Hungarian refugees to the United States over a period of 90 days, with an additional 11,000 being settled, also in the US, in the following year.  Operation Safe Haven was the most significant European humanitarian airlift since the Berlin Airlift. The operation, ordered by Pres. Dwight D. Eisenhower was executed almost simultaneously to that launched by Elvis Presley at the closer of his last appearance on the Ed Sullivan Show, as broadcast live to an audience of 54.6 million on January 6, 1957 and which eventually covered a quarter of a million refugees and their settlement in Austria and England.

Operation as mandated by US President, Dwight D. Eisenhower and its legacy 
The airlift was ordered by President Dwight D. Eisenhower on Dec. 10, 1956, as a Cold War response to the Soviet suppression of the Hungarian revolt.  It was a joint endeavor by the United States Bolling and Military Air Transport Services, the United States Navy, and various commercial aircraft.  On January 1, 1957, air transports from the 1608th Air Transport Wing from Charleston Air Force Base, S.C., and 175 aircraft from the 1611th Air Transport Wing from McGuire AFB, N.J., relocated 9,700 refugees to the United States, under the direction of Airlift Task Force commander Major General George B. Dany.  In addition to air transport, from December 18, 1956, through February 14, 1957, ships of the Navy's Military Sea Transportation Service (USNS Eltinge, Haan, Marine Carp, and Walker) transported 8,944 refugees from Bremerhaven, Germany, to Camp Kilmer, NJ, USA.  These refugees were job-classified by the U.S. Labor Department as they made their way to American shores. In total, some 38,000 refugees were permanently resettled in the United States.

Concurrent charitable appeal by Elvis Presley and its legacy  
On Sunday 28 October 1956, some 56.5 million television viewers in the US were watching the popular Ed Sullivan Show, on which Elvis Presley (1935–77) was headlining for the second time. Earlier, in  the day, at 2.30 in the afternoon, he received Dr. Jonas Salk's  polio vaccine in front of the world's media. During the actual  broadcast, Ed Sullivan made a casual mention of the need to send aid to the Hungarian refugees, but no appeal was formally made. This led to Presley's official request, for his third and last appearance on the show, for Mr. Sullivan, this time on his personal behalf, to ask viewers to send contributions. On 6 January 1957 an estimated 54.6 million viewers watched this episode. In it, Presley made another request for donations and as suggested by Ed Sullivan, dedicated a song which, in his opinion, fit the mood properly as the episode's finale: the African American gospel song "Peace in the Valley". By the end of 1957, some US$6 million were received by the Geneva-based International Red Cross, and which translated into food rations, clothing, and other essentials. These in turn were distributed with the help of the US Air Force, which flew 100 sorties to deliver these supplies to the estimated 250,000 refugees, the majority of whom settled, for life, in Austria and England. One of the transport planes was the same which delivered him and another 40 soldiers back to the United States, on March 3, 1960 after his 16 months in Germany. The plane is now at the Air Force Museum. 

On 1 March 2011, Budapest Mayor István Tarlós announced that the city would posthumously make Presley an honorary citizen, as well as name a small park facing the Margaret Bridge (its second oldest crossing) after him. These honors were designed as a gesture of gratitude for his involvement in lessening the plight of the above mentioned quarter million refugees not covered by Operation Safe Haven.  As a result, he is the only US-born person to be included in the list of personalities who were named as Honorary Citizens of Budapest, joining the Hungarian born (later US-nationalized) physicist and father of the hydrogen bomb Edward Teller, as well as other eminent personalities including Czech activist and President Václav Havel, Polish dissident, President and Nobel Peace Prize laureate Lech Walesa, Swedish diplomat and martyr Raoul Wallenberg, Hungarian chess grandmaster Judith Polgar and inventor Ernő Rubik.

Bibliography 

Navy History
DC Military
Time Magazine
U.S. Air Force

References 

Safe Haven
1957 in military history
Hungarian Revolution of 1956
Hungary–United States relations
Soviet Union–United States relations
Airlifts